Spectrum Brands Holdings, Inc. is an American diversified company. Headquartered in Middleton, Wisconsin, it was established in 2005 as the successor company to Rayovac Corporation. It is one of the Fortune 500 companies, and among the largest of its kind on the list.

The company manufactures and markets home appliances under the Remington, Black & Decker, George Foreman, and Russell Hobbs brand names, lawn and garden care products under the Spectracide and Garden Safe brand names, and insect repellents under the Cutter and Repel brand names. Spectrum owns several pet care companies, both in the aquarium supply and companion animal trades. In the aquarium business, Spectrum owns Tetra, Whisper, Marineland, Perfecto, Jungle, Instant Ocean, Visi-Therm, and other product lines. Companion animal lines consist of Dingo, Nature's Miracle, Lazy Pet, Wonderbox, Furminator, IAMS, Eukanuba and others. Both aquarium lines and companion lines are concentrated into Spectrum's United Pet Group based in Cincinnati, Ohio. Spectrum's Hardware & Home Improvement division includes brands such as Kwikset, Baldwin, National Hardware, Pfister, and more.

On February 26, 2018, the company announced it was merging with controlling shareholder HRG Group. As of 2018, Spectrum Brands is ranked #422 on the Fortune 500 rankings of the largest United States corporations by total revenue.

Spectrum manufactured and sold batteries under the Rayovac and Varta brand names, until it sold its battery division to long-time Rayovac competitor Energizer in January 2018. In November 2018, the company sold their global auto care division (brands which included Armor All, STP, and A/C Pro), to Energizer as well.

History

In 1906, the French Battery Company was founded in Chicago by James Bowen Ramsay (1869–1952). Its first president was German-born chemist, Alfred Landau. He had been making batteries in Europe. The Ramsay collective invested in Landau's functioning low profile Columbia Dry Battery Company which had been halted by copyright issues regarding the adopted name "Columbia". The re-started and re-named assembly plant soon relocated to Wisconsin where Landau's efforts to advance the French company too quickly, combined with a bad run of batteries, led to virtual bankruptcy and he was sacked. He moved on to Toronto, and set up a factory making X-Cell brand batteries for Canada.

Neither Ramsay nor the other shareholders knew how to make batteries, but Ramsay's leadership kept the enterprise alive, by having assembly line staff make the "Fleur de lis" branded batteries to a lower standard. Ramsay's fiery self-belief in the industry led him to contract a university chemist C.F. Burgess to concoct a battery to rival those made in America and Europe. Burgess actually succeeded, to his own financial cost, and the company survived, with him becoming a shareholder; but after a fire destroyed the plant in 1915, he left to found his own successful battery company. French battery production accelerated through World War I, and by 1920, the French Battery Company had US$2.74 million in sales and 600 employees, and 1000 employees in 1931.

In 1930, the company name was changed to Ray-O-Vac, an allusion to the then-new technology of vacuum tubes and electron rays. In 1933, the company patented the first wearable vacuum tube hearing aid. During World War II, Rayovac supplied the United States military with nearly 500 million batteries. As a result of this, they were awarded eight Army-Navy "E" awards for major contributions to victory.

Diversification and name change
In 2003, Rayovac decided to diversify, and acquired non-battery related businesses including Remington Products and United Pet Group. In 2004, Rayovac successfully underbid Energizer (Eveready) as RadioShack's battery supplier and produced the "Enercell" brand of battery sold exclusively at RadioShack. In January 2005, Rayovac purchased United Industries Corporation for about $476 million in cash and stock. Brands included in United Industries were Vigoro, Spectracide and Sta-Green lawn products, Cutter, Hot Shot and Repel insect control products and pet supply products with the Marineland, Perfecto, and Eight in One brands.  In 2005, Tetra, a major provider of pet-fish products, was acquired.  This diversification prompted the name change from Rayovac to Spectrum Brands.

Rayovac also bought other battery companies including VARTA, Ningbo Baowang and Microlite S.A. The Microlite acquisition included the rights to the Rayovac name in Brazil, giving the company worldwide rights to the Rayovac name. With this acquisition, Rayovac consolidated its presence in the majority of countries in Latin America. Rayovac is a well recognized brand in this region.

On February 3, 2009, Spectrum filed for Chapter 11 bankruptcy protection.  The company later emerged from bankruptcy on August 28, 2009. Since emerging from Chapter 11, Spectrum has announced year-over-year increases in sales and adjusted earnings before interest, taxes, depreciation, and amortization for the second quarter of their fiscal 2010.

Rayovac, as a division of Spectrum Brands, remained headquartered in Madison, Wisconsin, along with Remington, even while the parent company, Spectrum Brands, was headquartered in Georgia. On April 15, 2010, Spectrum Brands announced that it would be moving its corporate headquarters back to Madison. Spectrum Brands moved its headquarters to Middleton, Wisconsin, a suburb of Madison, in October 2013.

Russell Hobbs Inc.
Spectrum Brands finalized a merger with Russell Hobbs, Inc., formerly known as Salton, Inc., on June 16, 2010, to form a new $3 billion consumer products company. Russell Hobbs' brands include George Foreman Grill, Toastmaster, Black & Decker Home appliances, and Russell Hobbs.

Stanley Black & Decker, and Assa Abloy 
In 2012, Spectrum also purchased many non-tool assets from Stanley Black & Decker, primarily hardware, plumbing, and locks. While the Russel Hobbs purchase brought Black & Decker licensing to Spectrum (for small appliances), the HHI purchase did not involve brands marketed under the Black & Decker name. In 2022, Spectrum began negotiations to sell the HHI division to Swedish lockmaker Assa Abloy.

Armored AutoGroup
On April 28, 2015, Spectrum Brands entered the automotive supply business by acquiring Armored Auto group.

HRG Group 
On January 16, 2018, the Rayovac division was bought by Energizer for $2 billion. On February 26, 2018, Spectrum Brands announced it was merging with controlling shareholder HRG Group, Inc. The move would not affect the pending sale of its battery division to Energizer. Spectrum management was expected to run the merged entity. The combined company is to be named Spectrum Brands Holdings, Inc. and trade under the ticker symbol SPB. The company will remain in Middleton.

In September 2021, Spectrum sold its Hardware and Home Improvement ("HHI") division to Assa Abloy for $4.3 billion. HHI has a varied portfolio of products, including patented SmartKey technology and electronic, smart and biometric locks. Key brands include Kwikset, Baldwin, Weiser, Pfister and National Hardware. HHI is headquartered in Lake Forest, California with some 7,500 employees worldwide and has manufacturing facilities in the United States, Mexico, Taiwan, China, and the Philippines.

Battery products 
Rayovac formerly manufactured alkaline batteries ranging in size from AAA to 9V, rechargeable nickel–metal hydride batteries, hearing aid batteries, lithium photo batteries, specialty batteries and portable power chargers. In addition, a variety of portable LED flashlights and lanterns are produced under the Rayovac brand, prior to its sale to Energizer Holdings.

See also
 British Ever Ready Electrical Company

References

Further reading 
 Noor, Robert; et al., "RAYOVAC Case Analysis", Southern Methodist University (archived 2006).

External links 
 
 Rayovac International
 Remington US
 Russell Hobbs US
 Russell Hobbs UK
 Remington UK
 Juiceman
 Breadman
 Rayovac Records at Wisconsin Historical Society

1906 establishments in Wisconsin
Companies based in Madison, Wisconsin
Companies listed on the New York Stock Exchange
Companies that filed for Chapter 11 bankruptcy in 2009
Conglomerate companies established in 1906
Conglomerate companies of the United States
Consumer battery manufacturers
Home appliance manufacturers of the United States
Manufacturing companies based in Wisconsin
Manufacturing companies established in 1906
Middleton, Wisconsin